Johann Sebastian Bach composed the church cantata  (Ah, dear Christians, be comforted), 114, in Leipzig for the 17th Sunday after Trinity and first performed it on 1 October 1724.

Bach created the work as part of his second annual cantata cycle when he was Thomaskantor (director of music) in Leipzig. That cycle was planned as a cycle of the chorale cantatas for all occasions of the liturgical year.  is based on a hymn of penitence by Johannes Gigas (1561). An unknown poet kept three stanzas in their original form, which Bach set as an opening chorale fantasia, a central fourth movement with the soprano accompanied only by the continuo, and a four-part closing chorale as movement 7. The poet reworded the other stanzas as arias and recitatives, including references to the prescribed gospel about the healing of a man with dropsy. Bach scored the cantata for four vocal parts, and a Baroque instrumental ensemble of a horn to reinforce the chorale tune, a transverse flute, 2 oboes, strings and continuo.

History and words 
Bach composed the cantata in his second year as Thomaskantor (director of music) in Leipzig for the 17th Sunday after Trinity. That year, Bach composed a cycle of chorale cantatas, begun on the first Sunday after Trinity of 1724. The prescribed readings for the Sunday were from the Epistle to the Ephesians, the admonition to keep the unity of the Spirit, and from the Gospel of Luke, healing a man with dropsy on the Sabbath.

The cantata is based on a song of penitence, "", in six stanzas by Johannes Gigas (1561), sung to the melody of "". The hymn is only distantly related to the readings, concentrating on the thought that the Christians sin and deserve punishment, but may be raised to joy in a "" (blessed death). An unknown poet kept the first, third and sixth stanza as movements 1, 4 and 7 of the cantata. He derived movements 2 and 3, aria and recitative, from stanza 2, movement 5, another aria, from stanza 4, and the last recitative from stanza 5. In movement 3, he deviated from the song text, expanding in connection to the gospel that sin in general is comparable to the dropsy, "" (this sinful dropsy leads to destruction and will be fatal to you), and alluding to Adam's fall, caused by self-exaltation in the forbidden quest to be like God, "" (Pride first ate the forbidden fruit, to be like God).

Bach first performed the cantata on 1 October 1724, only two days after the first performance of his chorale cantata , on the feast of Michael, the archangel, 29 September 1724.

Music

Structure and scoring 
Bach structured the cantata in seven movements. The chorale tune is used in movements 1, 4 and 7, as a chorale fantasia, a chorale sung by a solo voice, and a four-part closing chorale. These three movements frame two sets of aria and recitative. Bach scored the work for four vocal soloists (soprano (S), alto (A), tenor (T) and bass (B)), a four-part choir, and a Baroque instrumental ensemble of horn (Co) to double the soprano, flauto traverso (Ft), two oboes (Ob), two violins (Vl), viola (Va), and basso continuo. The title of the autograph score reads: "Dom: 17 post Trin: / Ach lieben Xsten seyd getrost / a 4 Voc: / Corno / 2 Hautbois / 2 Violini / Viola / con / Continuo / di / Sign:JS:Bach".

In the following table of the movements, the keys and time signatures are taken from the Bach scholar Alfred Dürr, using the symbol for common time (4/4). The instruments are shown separately for brass, woodwinds and strings, while the continuo, playing throughout, is not shown.

Movements

1 
In the opening chorale fantasia, "" (Ah, dear Christians, be comforted), Bach expresses two thoughts of the text, comfort and fear, by contrasting themes that appear simultaneously in the instruments: an assertive theme is derived from the melody and played by the two oboes and first violins, an "anxious" one in the second violins and the continuo. The soprano sings the melody as a cantus firmus, doubled by the horn, while the lower voices are set partly in expressive imitation, partly in homophony. They are treated differently to reflect the meaning of the text. The Bach scholar Klaus Hofmann compares the movement to the opening of the cantata Jesu, der du meine Seele, BWV 78, written three weeks earlier: both "a sort of chaconne" in G minor, with a "French style" bass as "the expression of mourning and lamentation".

2 
The first aria is set for tenor with a virtuoso flute, "" (Where, in this valley of suffering). It contrasts again the anxious question "" (Where ... is the refuge of my spirit?) and the trusting "" (However, to Jesus' fatherly hands I will turn in my weakness), The anxious question returns in the da capo form.

3 
The first recitative, "" (O sinner, bear with patience), begins secco, but expresses the contrasting words "" (exalt) and "" (humbled) from the Gospel as an arioso.

4 
The chorale stanza, "" (The grain of wheat bears no fruit), is set for the soprano, accompanied only by the continuo. In its "starkness of the unembellished chorale", it is the centerpiece of the cantata.

5 
The alto aria, "" (You make me, o death, no longer fearful now), is the only movement of the cantata in a major key. A shift to minor on the words "" (One day, indeed, one must die) is even more striking.

6 
A final recitative "" (Therefore, consider your soul) invites to turn body and soul to God.

7 
The cantata ends with a four-part setting of the chorale melody, "" (Whether we wake or fall asleep), expressing "confidence in God".

Recordings 
The listing is taken from the Bach Cantatas Website. Ensembles playing period instruments in historically informed performance are marked by green background.

References

Sources 
 
 Ach, lieben Christen, seid getrost BWV 114; BC A 139 / Chorale cantata (17th Sunday after Trinity ) Bach Digital
 BWV 114 Ach, lieben Christen, seid getrost: English translation, University of Vermont
 Luke Dahn: BWV 114.7 bach-chorales.com

Church cantatas by Johann Sebastian Bach
1724 compositions
Chorale cantatas